HD 117618, named Döfida by the IAU, is a single, yellow-hued star in the southern constellation of Centaurus. With an apparent visual magnitude of 7.17, it is too faint to be visible to the naked eyes of a typical observer. It is moving further away with a heliocentric radial velocity of around +1.6 km/s.

This star is similar to the Sun, being a G-type main-sequence star with a stellar classification of G0 V. It is about 10% more massive and 17% larger than the Sun, with an estimated age of roughly four billion years and a projected rotational velocity of 3.67 km/s. The star is radiating 1.6 times the Sun's luminosity from its photosphere at an effective temperature of 6,019 K.

Name

HD 117618, and its planet HD 117618b, were chosen as part of the 2019 NameExoWorlds campaign organised by the International Astronomical Union, which assigned each country a star and planet to be named. HD 117618 was assigned to Indonesia. The winning proposal named the star "Döfida" meaning our star in Nias language, and its planet "Noifasui" meaning revolve around in Nias language (derived from the word ifasui, meaning to revolve around, and no, indicating that the action occurred in the past and continued to the present time).

Planetary system

In 2005, the Anglo-Australian Planet Search program announced the discovery of a low-mass planet in orbit around HD 117618. This object was found through measurements of radial velocity variation, which were larger than those produced by the intrinsic jitter of the host star. The lower bound on the object's mass was estimated to be . These values were subsequently refined, as shown in the table below.

See also 
 HD 117207
 List of extrasolar planets

References

G-type main-sequence stars
Planetary systems with one confirmed planet
Centaurus (constellation)
Durchmusterung objects
117618
066047